USS Fuller may refer to the following ships of the United States Navy:

 , a destroyer commissioned in 1920 and wrecked in the Honda Point Disaster in 1923
 , a transport commissioned in 1941 and decommissioned in 1946

United States Navy ship names